Ye Jixiong (born 25 May 1993) is a Chinese Paralympic powerlifter. He won the silver medal in the men's 88 kg event at the 2020 Summer Paralympics held in Tokyo, Japan. He is also a three-time medalist, including two gold medals, at the World Para Powerlifting Championships.

Career

In 2017, he won the gold medal in the men's 88 kg event at the World Para Powerlifting Championships held in Mexico City, Mexico.

At the 2018 Asia-Oceania Open Powerlifting Championships held in Kitakyushu, Japan, he set a new world record of 233.5 kg. At the 2019 World Para Powerlifting Championships held in Nur-Sultan, Kazakhstan, he won the gold medal in the men's 88 kg event.

Results

References

External links
 

1993 births
Living people
Chinese powerlifters
Male powerlifters
Paralympic powerlifters of China
Paralympic silver medalists for China
Paralympic medalists in powerlifting
Powerlifters at the 2020 Summer Paralympics
Medalists at the 2020 Summer Paralympics
Weightlifters from Guangdong
21st-century Chinese people